Jürgen Uhde (1913 in Hamburg – 1991 in Bad Soden am Taunus) was a German musicologist, pianist, university lecturer and piano teacher at the State University of Music and Performing Arts Stuttgart.

Principal students 
  
 Helmut Lachenmann
 Dieter Weber

Selected publications 
 Der Dienst der Musik (Vortrag, gehalten in der Stuttgarter „Privatstudiengesellschaft“ im November 1949). Zollion-Zürich 1950 (= Theologische Studien. Eine Schriftenreihe, hg. von Karl Barth, 30)
 Bartók, Mikrokosmos: Spielanweisungen und Erläuterungen. Eine Einführung in das Werk und seine pädagogischen Absichten. Zur Neubewertung von Béla Bartóks Mikrokosmos. , Regensburg, 1952, ; 2nd edition 1988.
 Béla Bartók. Kolloquium Verlag, Berlin, 1959 (Köpfe des XX. Jahrhunderts, 11).
 Prisma der gegenwärtigen Musik. Tendenzen und Probleme des zeitgenössischen Schaffens, published by Joachim Ernst Berendt and Jürgen Uhde. Furche, Hamburg 1959 
 Beethovens Klaviermusik. 3 volumes. Reclam-Verlag, Stuttgart, 1968–1974 (und öfter), .
 Denken und Spielen. Studien zu einer Theorie der musikalischen Darstellung [together with Renate Wieland]. Bärenreiter-Verlag, Kassel, 1988 (2nd edition 1990).
 Forschendes Üben. Wege instrumentalen Lernens [together with Renate Wieland]. Bärenreiter-Verlag, Kassel, 2002.

External links 
 

1913 births
1991 deaths
Writers from Hamburg
German classical pianists
Male classical pianists
German music educators
20th-century German musicologists
20th-century classical pianists
20th-century German male musicians